KWMC 1490 AM is a radio station licensed to Del Rio, Texas. The station airs a classic hits format and is owned by Minerva Garza Valdez.

History
KWMC came to air in 1967.

References

External links
KWMC 1490 AM Facebook

WMC
Classic hits radio stations in the United States